The 15th Ludhiana Sikhs was an infantry regiment in the British Indian Army. They could trace their origins to 1846, when they were known as the Regiment of Ludhiana (or the Loodiana Regiment). During the Indian Mutiny they were relied upon to hold Benares throughout the period of the Mutiny. In 1861, they became the 15th Bengal Native Infantry and shortly afterwards to the 15th (Ludhiana) Regiment of Bengal Native Infantry in 1864. Further changes in title followed they became the 15th Regiment of Bengal Native Infantry (Ludhiana Sikhs) in 1885, the 15th (Ludhiana) Sikh Infantry in 1901 and the 15th Ludhiana Sikhs following the Kitchener reforms of the Indian Army in 1903. To honour the visit of the Prince and Princess of Wales to Indian they took part in the Rawalpindi Parade 1905.

During this time they took part in the Battle of Ahmed Khel and the Battle of Kandahar in the  Second Anglo-Afghan War. They then took part in the Battle of Tofrek and Suakin in the Mahdist War, the Chitral Expedition and the Tirah Campaign and World War I. During World War I they were part of the 8th (Jullundur) Brigade, 3rd (Lahore) Division they served on the Western Front in France, in Egypt as part of the Western Frontier Force, and in the Mesopotamia Campaign.

After World War I the Indian government reformed the army again moving from single battalion regiments to multi battalion regiments. The 15th Ludhiana Sikhs now became the 2nd Battalion, 2 Sikh Regiment. This regiment was allocated to the new Indian Army after independence.

Victoria Cross
Lieutenant John Smyth 15th Ludhiana Sikhs, was awarded the Victoria Cross, the United Kingdom's highest award for bravery in combat. The citation for this award, published in the London Gazette read:

The 15th Ludhiana Sikhs and the Senussi

In 1914, during the World War I the 15th Ludhiana Sikhs operated as part of the 8th (Jullundur) Brigade, 3rd Lahore Division on the Western Front in France, but was moved to Egypt in the late 1915 to fight against the Senussi, a tribal sect of Muslims led by Sayed Ahmed, also known as the Senussi. The devout Muslims were trained in battle and assisted by several Turkish military officers. The support received from the influential Turkish leader Nuri Bey has brought the Senussi a considerable advantage while fighting off the Italian occupiers of Libya. When the German submarines started aiding Turkey and the Senussi by bringing weapons to Libya and attacking the coast of Egypt, Nuri Bey, half-brother of Enver Pasha, the Turkish War Minister at the moment, persuaded Sayed Ahmed to fight against Britain and join forces with Turkey to invade Egypt in the Turkish Holy War.

The Senussi were given the first mission in Egypt after a German submarine sank two British ships in November 1915 at the western coast of Egypt. They were given the task of keeping the survivors of the attacks on Tara and Moorina in captivity. Two British outposts were afterwards attacked by the Senussi at Sidi el Barrani and Sollum, determining the British Headquarters located in Cairo to give orders of withdrawal. British troops posted west of Matruh withdrew leaving back in their haste the Egyptian Coastguards at Sollum most of whom deserted the British order and joined forces with the Senussi.

Wadi Senab

On 20 November 1915 the Western Frontier Force was formed with Commander Major-General A. Wallace in the lead. The Western Frontier Force consisted of an infantry brigade containing partially trained battalions, the 2/7th and 2/8th Middlesex, the 15th Ludhiana Sikhs and the 6th Royal Scots, and the cavalry brigade containing three British Yeomanry regiments. The 15th Sikhs represented the regular major unit of the Western Frontier Force. The garrison placed at Matruh gathered more than 1,300 men by December, while the Senussi numbered with approximation over 2,000 men in that area.

The 15th Ludhiana Sikhs were given the first mission against the Senussi on 11 December when General Wallace appointed Lieutenant-colonel J.L.R. Gordon leader of a column and gave him the task of breaking the ranks of the enemy at Duwwar Hussein. The column sent also consisted of the Notts Battery with guns, armoured cars and the 2nd Composite Yeomanry Regiment. The first clash with the enemy in the Wadi (valley) Senab turned favorably only when the squadron of Australian Light Horse intervened and helped the cavalry. Gordon left one company of the 15th Ludhiana Sikhs behind to protect the camp and planned to march towards Duwwar Hussein using two routes. While the British soldiers were driven back by the heavy trained Senussi without engaging in battle, No. 2 Company of the Sikhs, who were appointed as the advanced guard, started firing and fighting back winning some mounts. While the enemy's flank increased and the British cavalry couldn't reorganize in time, the advanced guard, the 15th Sikhs were ordered to withdraw. Captain C.F.W. Hughes, the 15th Ludhiana Sikhs commander, decided to remain stationary in order to protect the wounded. With the combined help of the troops and the sloop, which fired at the Senussi with two 4-inch weapons, the enemy was forced back and the 15th Sikhs gained the opportunity to regroup and take care of the dead and the wounded.

‘The enemy had been driven off, but had been able to retire unmolested, and must be given credit for the surprise and the vigour of his attack.  Had the standard of training and the experience of the whole column been equal to those of the 15th Sikhs, the Senussi might have been heavily defeated.’

Conclusion
15th Sikhs were involved in the action around Wadi Majid and Halazin as well until their orders were to proceed to India. The 15th Sikhs constituted a serious aiding force for the understaffed and untrained Western Frontier Force. The results obtained by this regiment were seen with distinction and 15th Sikhs were given the honour ‘Egypt 1915-17.’ After the Indian Army's post-war reforms, the regiment became known as the 2nd Battalion, 2 Sikh Regiment.

References

Sources

British Indian Army infantry regiments
Honourable East India Company regiments
Military units and formations established in 1846
1846 establishments in British India